Nina Young (born 1966) is a British-Australian actress.

Early life
Nina Young was born in 1966. She is the daughter of Perth businessman Peter Young and Tania Verstak, a woman of Russian origin who was Miss Australia 1961 and Miss International 1962.

Career
Young has made appearances in films such as the James Bond film Tomorrow Never Dies, as an assistant to Elliott Carver, Harry Potter and the Philosopher's Stone, in which she played the Grey Lady, one of the Hogwarts ghosts, and Johnny English, in which she played Pegasus' secretary. Young also has a non-speaking part in the 2010 re-make Clash of the Titans, playing Greek Goddess Hera. She appeared as Alison in a second series episode of Joking Apart. She was also a regular in Series 3 of The Demon Headmaster in 1998, playing Professor Rowe.

Filmography
England, My England (1995)
Tomorrow Never Dies (1997)
Sliding Doors (1998)
Harry Potter and the Philosopher's Stone (2001)
Warrior Angels (2002)
Johnny English (2003)
Things to Do Before You're 30 (2005)
The Mistress of Spices (2005)
Clash of the Titans (2010)
Payback Season (2012)

References

External links

1966 births
Living people
Australian film actresses
Australian people of Russian descent
Place of birth missing (living people)
20th-century Australian actresses
21st-century Australian actresses
Australian television actresses